Khaluun elgen nutag is a popular Mongolian patriotic song. The words were written by Jamtsyn Badraa and the music was composed by Tsegmidiin Namsraijav.

A monument showing the lyrics was dedicated to the song in front of the Ministry of Foreign Affairs in Ulaanbaatar.

Lyrics

Mongolian songs
Patriotic songs